"Si Pruebas una Vez" is a song recorded by American duo Ha*Ash. It was first included on Ha*Ash's first studio album Ha*Ash (2003) where it was released as the fifth single and then included on their live album edition deluxe Primera Fila: Hecho Realidad (2015).

Background and release 
"Si Pruebas una Vez" was written by Ángela Dávalos and Juan Luis Broissin Cruz. It serves as the nine track to her first studio album Ha*Ash (2003) and then recorded live for his live album edition deluxe Primera Fila: Hecho Realidad (2015).

On November, 2004, the track was re-released as a digital download as the promotional single for Ha*Ash. The track "Soy Mujer", which also appeared on the parent album, were also released digitally.

Music video 
A music video for "Si Pruebas una Vez" for his live album edition deluxe Primera Fila: Hecho Realidad (2015) was released on November 20, 2015. It was directed by Nahuel Lerena. The video was filmed in Lake Charles, Louisiana, United States.

Commercial performance 
The track peaked at number 5 in the Monitor Latino charts in the Mexico.

Credits and personnel 
Credits adapted from Genius.

Recording and management

 Sony / ATV Discos Music Publishing LLC / Westwood Publishing
 2003 Recording Country: México (studio version)
 2015 Recording Country: United States (live version)
 (P) 2003 Sony Music Entertainment México, S.A. De C.V. (studio version)
 (P) 2015 Sony Music Entertainment México, S.A. De C.V. (live version)

Ha*Ash
 Ashley Grace  – vocals, guitar (studio version / live version)
 Hanna Nicole  – vocals, guitar (studio version / live version)
Additional personnel
 Ángela Dávalos  – composer (studio version / live version)
 Juan Luis Broissin Cruz  – composer (studio version / live version)
 Armando Ávila  – guitar, acoustic guitar, recording engineer (studio version)
 Áureo Baqueiro  – recording engineer (studio version)
 Pablo De La Loza  – co-producer, co-director (live version)
 George Noriega  – producer (live version)
 Tim Mitchell  – producer (live version)

Charts

Release history

References 

Ha*Ash songs
2004 songs
2004 singles
Spanish-language songs
Pop ballads
Sony Music Latin singles
2000s ballads
Song recordings produced by Áureo Baqueiro
Songs written by Angela Dávalos